Lee Sala (May 26, 1926 – December 3, 2012) was a leading contender for the middleweight boxing crown in the 1940s and 50s. His professional career spanned from 1946 until 1953, with a record of 76 wins, 7 losses, 0 draws, and 48 knockouts.

Early life

Lee was born to a working class family of Italian descent in Donora, Pennsylvania. He was brought up during the Great Depression, with a house full of relatives including 5 siblings, and two of his cousins. His father, a bricklayer by trade worked very hard to put food on the table, even when there were no jobs available. Lee accredits his desire to box to his cousins Bruno and Libro Sala who were both professional boxers in the 1920s and 30's, Both of whom were top contenders. The Sala's were a very athletic family. Lee's older brother Tony was an All-American football player at Villanova University, as well as intercollegiate boxing champion 4 years in a row. His younger brother Fritz was a baseball prospect in his youth.

U.S. military service

Lee enlisted in the United States Navy in 1944 During World War II. During his tenure in the Navy, he won the Navy olympic amateur championship of north Japan.

Professional career

After being honorably discharged from the Navy in 1946, Lee turned professional. Winning his first bout against Sonny Hope by knockout in round 4. Lee then went on a 47-fight winning streak, finally losing a decision to Tony DeMicco. He avenged his loss 2 weeks later Lee fought many top contenders of his time, and newspaper articles reveal that he was in line for a title shot on several occasions. Some say that Lee "hit to hard" and that is why those matches never came to fruition. A Washington Post article from June 19, 1948 reveals that Promoter Jack McGinley offered Rocky Graziano $25,000 for a non title shot against Sala, the offer was declined. At one point Sala had outstanding offers to fight both Sugar Ray Robinson and Jake LaMotta for the title. LaMotta received offers from Sala's manager Bunny Buntag upwards of $50,000. Sala was next in line for a title shot against Robinson after LaMotta's loss to "Sugar" Ray in 1951, however Robinson signed to fight Holly Mims  One of Sala's most memorable bouts was against Syracuses' Joey Dejohn, who went on to fight Jake LaMotta. Sala was knocked down 5 times, but in the 6th round, he was able to turn it around and knock DeJohn out, breaking Dejohn's Jaw in the process.
Sala remained a top-10 middleweight contender for the majority of his career, and finally retired after a few setbacks to big-name fighters such as Carl "Bobo" Olson. Sala had also just married Florida beauty queen Adeline Mondello, and was planning on starting a family.

After Lee retired from boxing, he and his wife had 2 children. He started working in the whiskey distribution business, and later became a deputy sheriff for the Hillsborough County Sheriff's Office. He lived in Tampa, Florida with his wife, daughter and grandson, and died on December 3, 2012.

References

1926 births
2012 deaths
People from Donora, Pennsylvania
American people of Italian descent
American male boxers
Middleweight boxers
United States Navy personnel of World War II